Mobarakeh (also Romanized as Mobārakeh; also known as Mobādak, Mubādak, and Tabārakeh) is a village in, and the capital of, Mobarakeh Rural District of the Central District of Marvast County, Yazd province, Iran. At the 2006 National Census, its population was 360 in 90 households. The following census in 2011 counted 361 people in 92 households. The latest census in 2016 showed a population of 360 people in 109 households.

References 

Populated places in Yazd Province